Robert James Fitzsimmons (26 May 1863 – 22 October 1917) was a British professional boxer who was the sport's first three-division world champion. He also achieved fame for beating Gentleman Jim Corbett (the man who beat John L. Sullivan), and he is in The Guinness Book of World Records as the lightest heavyweight champion, weighing just 165 pounds when he won the title. Nicknamed Ruby Robert and The Freckled Wonder, he took pride in his lack of scars and appeared in the ring wearing heavy woollen underwear to conceal the disparity between his trunk and leg-development.

Considered one of the hardest punchers in boxing history, Fitzsimmons is ranked as No. 8 on The Ring magazine's list of 100 greatest punchers of all time.

Early life 

Robert James Fitzsimmons was born on 26 May 1863 in Helston, Cornwall, England, the youngest of seven boys and five girls born to James and Jane Fitzsimmons. Not long before his birth, his parents had moved from his father's native Ireland to Cornwall, where his mother came from, in order for his father to find work as a policeman. Fitzsimmons received his early education at the National school in Helston. In 1873, the family moved again; James, Jane and their youngest five children sailed on the Adamant for the 93-day journey to Lyttelton, New Zealand.

They settled in Timaru, a town 147 km (91 miles) south-west of Lyttelton populated mainly by Cornish immigrants, and James Fitzsimmons established a blacksmith's forge in the town. Once Fitzsimmons had completed his education at the Timaru Main School, he took on a range of jobs. He wanted to join the crew of the Isabella Ridley, and do some service as a sailor, hoping that it would toughen him up for a career in boxing, but the ship was badly damaged in storms while still docked in Timaru. Instead, he took on a range of jobs; as a butcher's delivery boy, a carriage painter, striker at an iron foundry, and a decorator, before becoming an apprentice at his family's blacksmith's forge with his brother Jarrett. His time working in the blacksmith's forge helped to develop his upper body, particularly his arms and shoulders. During his time working in the blacksmith's forge, there are stories that Fitzsimmons was not averse to fighting quarrelsome, often drunk, customers, and it was suggested that this even boosted business, as customers returned to the forge, hoping to see a fight.

Amateur career 
In the early 1880s Jem Mace, an English bare-knuckle boxer, travelled to New Zealand, and Timaru hosted both his boxing school, and the first boxing championships held in New Zealand. Fitzsimmons entered the tournament and knocked out four opponents on his way to winning the competition. He successfully defended his title in the subsequent competition. During one of these tournaments, it is often suggested that Fitzsimmons defeated Herbert Slade, a professional heavyweight boxer who was touring with Mace, but Slade was touted as being undefeated in 1883, and it is possible that it was Slade's brother that Fitzsimmons beat. After these tournaments, Fitzsimmons boxed at least six times in New Zealand, including some bare knuckle bouts, but it is unclear if he received payment for his fights during this time.

Professional career

Move to Australia 
Boxing record books show Fitzsimmons officially began boxing professionally in 1883, in Australia. He beat Jim Crawford there by getting a knockout in three rounds. Fitzsimmons had his first 28 definite professional fights in Australia, where he lost the Australian middleweight title to Mick Dooley (rumours spoke of a fixed bout) and where he also won a fight by knockout while on the floor: when Edward Starlight Robins dropped Fitzsimmons to the canvas in round nine of their fight, he also broke his hand and could not continue, therefore the referee declared Fitzsimmons the winner by a knockout.

By this stage, Fitzsimmons had established his own style. He developed a certain movement and caginess from one of the greatest bare-knuckle fighters, Jem Mace. Mace encouraged Fitzsimmons to develop his punching technique, drawing on the enormous power he had gained from blacksmithing. Fitzsimmons delivered short, accurate and occasionally conclusive punches. He soon built up a reputation as by far the hardest puncher in boxing.

Winning the Middleweight title 
Moving on to the United States, Fitzsimmons fought four more times in 1890, winning three and drawing one.

Then, on 14 January 1891, in New Orleans, he won his first world title from Jack (Nonpareil) Dempsey. Fitzsimmons knocked out Dempsey (from whom the later Jack Dempsey took his name) in the 13th round to become the World Middleweight Champion. Fitzsimmons knocked Dempsey down at least 13 times and by the finish left him in such a pitiable condition that he begged him to quit. Since Dempsey would not do so, Fitzsimmons knocked him out and then carried him to his corner. On 22 July, police broke off his fight with Jim Hall after he had knocked Hall down several times.

Fitzsimmons spent the next two years fighting non-title bouts and exhibitions until giving Hall a chance at the title in 1893. He retained the crown by a knockout in round four. He spent the rest of that year doing exhibitions, and on 2 June, he had scheduled a two-way exhibition where he would demonstrate in public how to hit the boxing bag and then how to box against a real opponent. Reportedly, two freak accidents happened that day: Fitzsimmons hit the bag so hard that it broke, and then his opponent of that day allegedly slipped, getting hit in the head and the boxing exhibition was cancelled.

At a public sparring performance on 16 November 1894 at Jacob's Opera House, Syracuse, New York, Fitzsimmons knocked out sparring partner Con Riordan, who was carried off unconscious and died several hours later. Two months later Fitzsimmons was charged with manslaughter but was acquitted.

Fitzsimmons vs. Sharkey 

After vacating the Middleweight title, Fitzsimmons began campaigning at heavyweight (the light heavyweight division did not exist at that time). On 2 December 1896, the San Francisco Athletic Club sponsored a fight at the Mechanics' Pavilion in San Francisco between Fitzsimmons and Tom Sharkey. Unable to find a referee, they called on former lawman Wyatt Earp. He had officiated 30 or so matches in earlier days, though not under the Marquess of Queensberry rules. The fight may have been the most anticipated fight on American soil that year. Fitzsimmons was favoured to win, and bets flowed heavily his way. Earp entered the ring still armed with his customary Colt .45 and drew a lot of attention when he had to be disarmed. He later said he forgot he was wearing it. Fitzsimmons was taller and quicker than Sharkey and dominated the fight from the opening bell. In the eighth round, Fitzsimmons hit Sharkey with his famed "solar plexus punch," an uppercut under the heart that could render a man temporarily helpless. The punch caught Sharkey, Earp, and most of the crowd by surprise, and Sharkey dropped, clutched his groin, and rolled on the canvas, screaming foul.

Earp stopped the bout, ruling that Fitzsimmons had hit Sharkey with a low blow. His ruling was greeted with loud boos and catcalls. Very few witnessed the foul Earp ruled on. He awarded the decision to Sharkey, who attendants carried out as "...limp as a rag."

Winning the heavyweight title 

In 1896, Fitzsimmons won a disputed version of the World Heavyweight Championship in a fight in Langtry, Texas, against the Irish fighter Peter Maher. On 17 March 1897, in Carson City, Nevada, he knocked out American Jim Corbett, generally recognised as the legitimate World Heavyweight Champion (having won the title from John L. Sullivan in 1892) in round 14. This constituted a remarkable achievement, as Jim Corbett, a skilled boxer, weighed one stone 3 pounds (17 lb) more than Fitzsimmons. He out-boxed Fitzsimmons for several rounds, knocked him down in the sixth round and badly damaged his face with his jab, left hook and right hand, but Fitzsimmons kept coming and Corbett began to tire. In the 14th round, Fitzsimmons won the title with his "solar plexus" punch. Corbett collapsed in agony. Fitzsimmons' "solar plexus" punch became legendary, although he himself may never have used the phrase. The entire fight was filmed by Enoch J. Rector and released to cinemas as The Corbett-Fitzsimmons Fight, the longest film ever released at the time. Using her maiden name, it was covered by Nellie Verrill Mighels Davis, the first woman to report a prize fight.

Fitzsimmons spent the rest of 1897 and 1898 doing stage tours. In 1899, Fitzsimmons fought James J. Jeffries at the Coney Island Athletic Club near Brooklyn, New York. Most people gave Jeffries little chance, even though at over 15 stones (95 kg) he massively outweighed his opponent and was far younger, but Jeffries lifted the World Heavyweight Championship from Fitzsimmons with an 11th-round knockout.

In June 1901 Fitzsimmons took part in a wrestling match against Gus Ruhlin. He lost and went back to boxing. He then enjoyed legitimate boxing knockouts of leading contenders Ruhlin and Tom Sharkey.

In 1901 he published a book Physical Culture and Self-Defense (Philadelphia: D. Biddle). In 1902, he and Jeffries had a rematch, once again with the World Heavyweight Champion at stake. Fitzsimmons battered Jeffries, who suffered horrible punishment. With his nose and cheek bones broken, most would have sympathized with Jeffries had he quit, but he kept going until his enormous strength and youth wore down Bob and he knocked him out cold in round eight.

Winning the Light Heavyweight title 
In November 1903, Fitzsimmons made history by defeating World Light Heavyweight Champion George Gardiner (also known as Gardner) by a decision in 20 rounds, becoming the first boxer to win titles in three weight-divisions.

Soon afterward, he went back to the Heavyweights, where he kept fighting until 1914, with mixed results. In 1907 at age 44, Fitzsimmons fought much younger Jack Johnson, during the time period in which reigning champion James J. Jeffries refused to fight Johnson. The bout between Johnson and Fitzsimmons ended in victory for Johnson with a second round knockout.

Retirement 
Although Fitzsimmons became a world champion in each of the Middleweight, Light Heavyweight and Heavyweight divisions, historians do not consider him the first world Light Heavyweight Champion to become World Heavyweight Champion, because he won the Heavyweight title before winning the Light Heavyweight belt. Michael Spinks counts as the first Light Heavyweight World Champion to win the Heavyweight belt as well. However, Fitzsimmons was the first Middleweight Champion to win the Heavyweight title and the only Heavyweight Champion to drop down and win the Light Heavyweight title. Fitzsimmons and later Henry Armstrong were the only men to win undisputed world championships in three different weight classes.

Fitzsimmons had a final professional record of 66 wins with 59 by knockout, 8 losses, 4 draws, 19 no contests and 2 no decisions (Newspaper Decisions: 2–0–0).

Fitzsimmons's exact record remains unknown, as the boxing world often kept records poorly during his era.

Death and legacy 

Fitzsimmons died of pneumonia on 22 October 1917 in Chicago, survived by his fourth wife. His grave lies in the Graceland Cemetery, Uptown. Having four wives, a gambling habit and a susceptibility to confidence tricksters, he did not hold on to the money he made.

The statue Peace on the Dewey Arch was modelled on Fitzsimmons by the sculptor Daniel Chester French. A statue of Fitzsimmons has also stood in the city centre of Timaru, New Zealand, since 1987. It was commissioned by New Zealand millionaire boxing fan Bob Jones and sculpted by Margriet Windhausen.

The International Boxing Hall of Fame has made Fitzsimmons a member in its "Old Timer" category.

In 2003 The Ring named Fitzsimmons number eight of all time among boxing's best punchers.

Works

Personal life 
Fitzsimmons married four times and had six children, four of whom survived infancy.

Professional boxing record 
All information in this section is derived from BoxRec, unless otherwise stated.

Official record 

All newspaper decisions are officially regarded as “no decision” bouts and are not counted in the win/loss/draw column.

Unofficial record 

Record with the inclusion of newspaper decisions in the win/loss/draw column.

See also 

 List of heavyweight boxing champions
 List of light heavyweight boxing champions
 List of middleweight boxing champions
 List of boxing triple champions

Notes and references

Notes

References

Bibliography

Further reading 
Kiwis With Gloves On by Brian F O'Brien, published 1960, Reed.

External links 

 
 Boxing Hall of Fame
 A New Zealand tribute site
 ESPN.com
  in the Dictionary of New Zealand Biography
 Biography in the 1966 Encyclopaedia of New Zealand (birth year wrong)

1863 births
1917 deaths
19th-century British people
Bare-knuckle boxers
Burials at Graceland Cemetery (Chicago)
British emigrants to New Zealand
New Zealand people of Cornish descent
American people of Cornish descent
British emigrants to the United States
English male boxers
English people of Irish descent
Heavyweight boxers
International Boxing Hall of Fame inductees
Light-heavyweight boxers
Middleweight boxers
New Zealand male boxers
New Zealand emigrants to the United States
New Zealand people of English descent
People associated with physical culture
People from Helston
World boxing champions
World heavyweight boxing champions
New Zealand world boxing champions
World middleweight boxing champions
Deaths from pneumonia in Illinois